Hans Bodensteiner (November 12, 1912 in Moosbach - April 8, 1995 in Unkel) was a German politician, representative of the Christian Social Union of Bavaria and the GVP.

See also
List of Bavarian Christian Social Union politicians

References

1912 births
1995 deaths
People from Neustadt an der Waldnaab (district)
Members of the Bundestag for Bavaria
Members of the Bundestag 1949–1953
All-German People's Party politicians
Members of the Bundestag for the Christian Social Union in Bavaria